Longue Pointe (French for "Long Point") is a place located in northern Quebec, Canada. It is part of the Cree Nation of Chisasibi Category I Land (land for exclusive use by Cree) but has no permanent population. It is used by both Cree and Inuit natives as a harbour for their fishing boats.

It is among the furthest northern point reached by road in Quebec, extending from the James Bay Road (north of the Grand River). Only the Trans-Taiga Road extends farther to the north.

Location
It is accessible by a  gravel road from Hydro-Québec's La Grande-1 generating station, on the Grand River. Early European fur traders frequented these parts, around the start of the Hudson's Bay Company.

Image gallery

External links
Longe Pointe on Google Maps
James Bay Road Website
James Bay Hiking Trip

References

James Bay
Peninsulas of Quebec
Indian reserves in Quebec
Borders of Quebec
Borders of Nunavut
Landforms of Nord-du-Québec